Glenn Arwin January, Jr. (born May 25, 1983, in Houston, Texas) is a former professional Canadian football offensive tackle.

Early years 
He attended Second Baptist School and played high school football there. Additionally, he was in the choir his senior year, and part of a renowned dancing duet with his close pal Sam Whiteside. After having a small jazz band in Houston, TX with high school chaps with Jackson Osborne and Ronnie Bloomstrom, Glenn moved on to bigger and better things.  Collegiately, January was an offensive lineman for the Texas Tech Red Raiders.

Professional career 
He remained undrafted in the 2007 NFL Draft and signed as a free agent with the Buccaneers.

On May 30, 2007, January signed with the Toronto Argonauts of the Canadian Football League. On March 5, 2008, he was traded to the Saskatchewan Roughriders, along with Ronald Flemons, Toronto's first round selection in the 2008 CFL Draft, and Toronto's second round selection in the 2010 CFL Draft in exchange for Kerry Joseph and Saskatchewan's third round pick in the 2010 Canadian Draft. Both Toronto and Saskatchewan were unhappy with January's play, but he went on to a decent career with the Winnipeg Blue Bombers.

January became a free agent and signed the same day with the Winnipeg Blue Bombers on January 16, 2009. January won his first nod as a CFL East Division All-Star during the 2011 Winnipeg Blue Bombers season.

References

External links 
Winnipeg Blue Bombers bio 
Texas Tech profile

1983 births
Living people
American players of Canadian football
Canadian football offensive linemen
People from Houston
Saskatchewan Roughriders players
Tampa Bay Buccaneers players
Texas Tech Red Raiders football players
Toronto Argonauts players
Winnipeg Blue Bombers players